Olawale O. "Ola" Afolabi (born 15 March 1980) is a British professional boxer. He is a two-time former WBO interim cruiserweight champion, as well as a two-time former IBO cruiserweight champion. Nicknamed "Kryptonite", Afolabi was known in the ring for his slickness, counterpunching skills and durability. Born to Nigerian parents, Afolabi resides in California, where he also trained for the most of his career.

Career
Afolabi began his professional career in 2002, fighting at super middleweight and light heavyweight. In 2003 he was outpointed by Allan Green, prompting a full-time move to cruiserweight in 2004. He beat a small heavyweight clubfighter in Willie Chapman and added James Walton and Michael Simms to his victims. He also knocked out former Cruiserweight Champ Orlin Norris.

The win that put him into the limelight came over undefeated highly touted Golden Gloves champion Eric Fields whom he KO'ed in 2008. He was immediately signed to a promotional contract with Duva Boxing. Afolabi subsequently made his national television debut on ESPN's Friday Night Fights, winning a unanimous decision over DeLeon Tinsley.

In March 2009 he scored another upset KO by defeating former WBO World Cruiserweight champion Enzo Maccarinelli to win the Interim WBO cruiserweight title in Manchester, England.

His good run ended when he lost a very close decision against Marco Huck in Germany.

He rebounded with a first-round knockout over former European champion Terry Dunstan.

After his 4th fight with Huck, a 10th round stoppage loss, Afolabi decided to call time and announced his retirement.

Afolabi vs Huck II
After defeating 2 journeymen, Afolabi got a rematch against Huck on 5 May 2012, for Huck's WBO Cruiserweight championship, which would be in Germany as in their first match. In their previous bout, it was a very close fight ending with Huck escaping with a razor-thin majority decision victory. However, in the rematch, it was even closer than the first bout, with a brutal 12 rounds in a great fight. Unfortunately for Afolabi, the fight ended in a split draw, and Huck retained his WBO belt.

Professional boxing record

|-
| style="text-align:center;" colspan="8"|22 Wins (11 knockouts, 11 decisions), 6 Losses, 4 Draws
|-  style="text-align:center; background:#e3e3e3;"
|  style="border-style:none none solid solid; "|Result
|  style="border-style:none none solid solid; "|Record
|  style="border-style:none none solid solid; "|Opponent
|  style="border-style:none none solid solid; "|Type
|  style="border-style:none none solid solid; "|Rd., Time
|  style="border-style:none none solid solid; "|Date
|  style="border-style:none none solid solid; "|Location
|  style="border-style:none none solid solid; "|Notes
|- align=center
|Loss
|22–6–4
|align=left| Mario Daser
|
|
|
|align=left|
|align=left|
|- align=center
|Loss
|22–5–4
|align=left| Marco Huck
|
|
|
|align=left|
|align=left|
|- align=center
|Win
|22–4–4
|align=left| Rakhim Chakhkiyev
|
|
|
|align=left|
|align=left|
|- align=center
|Loss
|21–4–4
|align=left| Victor Emilio Ramírez	
|
|
|
|align=left|
|align=left|
|- align=center
|Win
|21–3–4
|align=left| Anthony Caputo Smith
|
|
|
|align=left|
|align=left|
|- align=center
|Win
|20–3–4
|align=left| Łukasz Janik
|
|
|
|align=left|
|align=left|
|- align=center
|Loss
|19–3–4
|align=left| Marco Huck
|
|
|
|align=left|
|align=left|
|- align=center
|style="background:#abcdef;"|Draw
|19–2–4
|align=left| Marco Huck
|
|
|
|align=left|
|align=left|
|- align=center
|Win
|19–2–3
|align=left| Valery Brudov
|
|
|
|align=left|
|align=left|
|- align=center
|Win
|18–2–3
|align=left| Lukasz Rusiewicz
|
|
|
|align=left|
|align=left|
|- align=center
|Win
|17–2–3
|align=left| Terry Dunstan
|
|
|
|align=left|
|align=left|
|- align=center
|Win
|16–2–3
|align=left| Lubos Suda
|
|
|
|align=left|
|align=left|
|- align=center
|Win
|15–2–3
|align=left| Sandro Siproshvili
|
|
|
|align=left|
|align=left|
|- align=center
|Loss
|14–2–3
|align=left| Marco Huck
|
|
|
|align=left|
|align=left|
|- align=center
|Win
|14–1–3
|align=left| Enzo Maccarinelli
|
|
|
|align=left|
|align=left|
|- align=center
|Win
|13–1–3
|align=left| DeLeon Tinsley
|
|
|
|align=left|
|align=left|
|- align=center
|Win
|12–1–3
|align=left| Eric Fields
|
|
|
|align=left|
|align=left|
|- align=center
|Win
|11–1–3
|align=left| Orlin Norris
|
|
|
|align=left|
|align=left|
|- align=center
|Win
|10–1–3
|align=left| Michael Simms
|
|
|
|align=left|
|align=left|
|- align=center
|Win
|9–1–3
|align=left| James Walton
|
|
|
|align=left|
|align=left|
|- align=center
|style="background:#abcdef;"|Draw
|8–1–3
|align=left| Jonathan Young
|
|
|
|align=left|
|align=left|
|- align=center
|Win
|8–1–2
|align=left| Willie Chapman
|
|
|
|align=left|
|align=left|
|- align=center
|Win
|7–1–2
|align=left| Carlos Raul Ibarra
|
|
|
|align=left|
|align=left|
|- align=center
|Win
|6–1–2
|align=left| Man Semou Diouf
|
|
|
|align=left|
|align=left|
|- align=center
|Win
|5–1–2
|align=left| Gustavo Arroyo
|
|
|
|align=left|
|align=left|
|- align=center
|Win
|4–1–2
|align=left| Germain Thedford
|
|
|
|align=left|
|align=left|
|- align=center
|style="background:#abcdef;"|Draw
|3–1–2
|align=left| Anthony Russell
|
|
|
|align=left|
|align=left|
|- align=center
|Win
|3–1–1
|align=left| Alejandro Rafael Virgen
|
|
|
|align=left|
|align=left|
|- align=center
|Loss
|2–1–1
|align=left| Allan Green
|
|
|
|align=left|
|align=left|
|- align=center
|Win
|2–0–1
|align=left| Joe Mendoza
|
|
|
|align=left|
|align=left|
|- align=center
|Win
|1–0–1
|align=left| Tom Perea
|
|
|
|align=left|
|align=left|
|- align=center
|style="background:#abcdef;"|Draw
|0–0–1
|align=left| Gerard Barber
|
|
|
|align=left|
|align=left|
|}

References

External links

1980 births
Living people
Cruiserweight boxers
English male boxers
English people of Nigerian descent
World cruiserweight boxing champions
Boxers from Greater London